Vladyslav Yuriyovych Dubinchak (born 1 July 1998) is a Ukrainian professional footballer who plays as a left-back for the Ukrainian Premier League club Dynamo Kyiv.

Career statistics

References

External links 
 
 

1998 births
Living people
Sportspeople from Vinnytsia Oblast
Ukrainian footballers
Ukraine youth international footballers
Ukraine under-21 international footballers
Association football defenders
FC Dynamo Kyiv players
FC Arsenal Kyiv players
FC Karpaty Lviv players
SC Dnipro-1 players
Ukrainian Premier League players
21st-century Ukrainian people